James Paul (born 1940) is an American conductor.

James Paul may also refer to:
 James Paul (footballer), Scottish footballer
 James A. Paul (born 1941), American writer and non-profit executive
 James Balfour Paul (1846–1931), Scottish nobleman
 James Patten Paul (1817–1891), Mormon pioneer
 James Paul (cricketer) (1888–1937), Argentine cricketer

See also
 
James Paull (disambiguation)